The 1954 Wakefield by-election was held on 21 October 1954 after the death of the incumbent Labour MP, Arthur Greenwood. It was retained by the Labour candidate Arthur Creech Jones.

The Conservative candidate, Maurice Macmillan, was the son of then-Minister of Defence and future Prime Minister Harold Macmillan. He would subsequently be a Cabinet Minister himself.

References

By-elections to the Parliament of the United Kingdom in West Yorkshire constituencies
Elections in Wakefield
Wakefield by-election
Wakefield by-election
Wakefield by-election
1950s in Yorkshire